Halesi Tuwachung is a municipality out of two municipalities in Khotang District of Province No. 1 of Nepal. It is in western part of the district and about 40 km far from Diktel, the headquarter of the district. It is named after the famous Halesi Mahadev.

The municipality is divided into 11 wards and total area of the municipality is 280.17 km2. According to 2011 census of Nepal, the municipality's population is 29,532 peoples.

References

Populated places in Khotang District
Khotang District
Municipalities in Koshi Province
Nepal municipalities established in 2017
Municipalities in Khotang District